Imchag (İmsäk) is a rural locality (a village) in Pisarevsky Selsoviet, Sharansky District, Bashkortostan, Russia. The population was 9 as of 2010. There is 1 street.

Geography 
Imchag is located 28 km north of Sharan (the district's administrative centre) by road. Pisarevo is the nearest rural locality.

References 

Rural localities in Sharansky District